, is a volleyball tournament in Japan.

Kurowashiki means the flag of black eagle. It opens in May every year at Osaka. It is organized by the Japan Volleyball Association and the Mainichi Newspapers.

History
1952  - It started as All Japan Volleyball Championship.
2007  - All Japan Volleyball Championship was renamed as Kurowashiki All Japan Volleyball Tournament.

Championship records
MEN

1952 - Yahata Steel
1953 - Yahata Steel
1954 - Nihon Koukan (NKK)
1955 - Nihon Koukan (NKK)
1956 - Sumitomo Metal Kokura
1957 - Yahata Steel
1958 - Sumitomo Metal Kokura
1959 - Nihon Koukan (NKK)
1960 - Yahata Steel
1961 - Toray
1962 - Nihon Koukan (NKK)
1963 - Toray
1964 - Matsushita Denki (Panasonic)
1965 - Nihon Koukan (NKK)
1966 - Matsushita Denki (Panasonic)
1967 - Yahata Steel
1968 - Matsushita Denki (Panasonic)
1969 - Matsushita Denki (Panasonic)
1970 - Nihon Koukan (NKK)
1971 - Nihon Koukan (NKK)
1972 - Sumitomo Light Metal
1973 - Matsushita Denki (Panasonic)
1974 - Shin Nihon Steel 
1975 - Shin Nihon Steel
1976 - Shin Nihon Steel
1977 - Shin Nihon Steel
1978 - Fuji Photo Film
1979 - Suntory
1980 - Shin Nihon Steel
1981 - Matsushita Denki (Panasonic)
1982 - Nihon Koukan (NKK)
1983 - Fuji Photo Film
1984 - Shin Nihon Steel
1985 - Suntory
1986 - Fuji Photo Film
1987 - Fuji Photo Film
1988 - Shin Nihon Steel
1989 - Shin Nihon Steel
1990 - Shin Nihon Steel
1991 - Suntory
1992 - NEC
1993 - NEC
1994 - NEC Blue Rockets
1995 - Suntory Sunbirds
1996 - NEC Blue Rockets
1997 - NEC Blue Rockets
1998 - Panasonic Panthers
1999 - NEC Blue Rockets
2000 - Suntory Sunbirds
2001 - JT Thunders
2002 - Toray Arrows
2003 - NEC Blue Rockets
2004 - JT Thunders
2005 - Toray Arrows
2006 - Toray Arrows 
2007 - NEC Blue Rockets
2008 - Panasonic Panthers
2009 - Panasonic Panthers
2010 - Panasonic Panthers
2011 - Toray Arrows 
2012 - Panasonic Panthers
2013 - Suntory Sunbirds
2014 - Panasonic Panthers
2015 - Suntory Sunbirds
2016 - JT Thunders
2017 - JT Thunders
2018 - Panasonic Panthers
2019 - Suntory Sunbirds
2020, 2021- Cancelled, due to COVID-19 pandemic in Japan
2022 - Suntory Sunbirds

WOMEN

1952 - Kurabo Manju
1953 - Nichibo Ashikaga
1954 - Kanebo Yokkaichi
1955 - Kurabo Kurashiki
1956 - Nichibo Kaizuka
1957 - Nichibo Kaizuka
1958 - Nichibo Kaizuka
1959 - Nichibo Kaizuka
1960 - Kurabo Kurashiki
1961 - Nichibo Kaizuka
1962 - Nichibo Kaizuka
1963 - Nichibo Kaizuka
1964 - Nichibo Kaizuka
1965 - Nichibo Kaizuka
1966 - Nichibo Kaizuka
1967 - Nichibo Kaizuka
1968 - Hitachi Musashi
1969 - Nichibo Kaizuka
1970 - Yashica
1971 - Unitika Kaizuka
1972 - Hitachi Musashi
1973 - Hitachi Musashi
1974 - Hitachi Musashi
1975 - Hitachi
1976 - Hitachi
1977 - Hitachi
1978 - Hitachi
1979 - Hitachi
1980 - Colorado Springs (United States)
1981 - Unitika
1982 - Hitachi
1983 - Hitachi
1984 - Hitachi
1985 - Hitachi
1986 - Daiei
1987 - Hitachi
1988 - Hitachi
1989 - Unitika
1990 - Ito Yokado
1991 - Unitika
1992 - Daiei
1993 - Hitachi
1994 - Hitachi Bellefille
1995 - Unitika Phoenix
1996 - Daiei Orange Attakers
1997 - NEC Red Rockets
1998 - Daiei Orange Attakers
1999 - Orange Attakers
2000 - Unitika Phoenix
2001 - NEC Red Rockets
2002 - Toray Arrows
2003 - Pioneer Red Wings
2004 - Toray Arrows
2005 - Pioneer Red Wings
2006 - Hisamitsu Springs
2007 - Hisamitsu Springs
2008 - Denso Airybees
2009 - Toray Arrows
2010 - Toray Arrows
2011 - JT Marvelous
2012 - JT Marvelous
2013 - Hisamitsu Springs
2014 - Toyota Auto Body Queenseis
2015 - JT Marvelous
2016 - JT Marvelous
2017 - Denso Airybees
2018 - JT Marvelous
2019 - Toray Arrows
2020, 2021- Cancelled, due to COVID-19 pandemic in Japan
2022 - Toray Arrows

References 

Volleyball competitions in Japan